Orhan Aktaş (born 21 October 1994) is a German professional footballer who plays as a left-back for Turkish club İnegölspor. He is a product of the Borussia Mönchengladbach Academy.

Career
In 2010, Aktaş joined Borussia Mönchengladbach at the age of 15. In 2012–13 season, he earned 24 appearances for Borussia Mönchengladbach in the Under 19 Bundesliga and scored two goals.

On 19 July 2013, Aktaş signed a three-year contract with Denizlispor in Turkey.

In February 2015, after a successful trial period, Aktaş joined Bulgarian side Haskovo. He made his league debut in a 1–1 away draw against Levski Sofia on 20 March 2015.

References

External links
 

1994 births
German people of Turkish descent
People from Würselen
Sportspeople from Cologne (region)
Footballers from North Rhine-Westphalia
Living people
German footballers
Turkish footballers
Association football defenders
Husqvarna FF players
FC Haskovo players
İstanbulspor footballers
Giresunspor footballers
Manisa FK footballers
Sarıyer S.K. footballers
Ankaraspor footballers
İnegölspor footballers
Superettan players
First Professional Football League (Bulgaria) players
TFF Second League players
German expatriate footballers
German expatriate sportspeople in Sweden
Expatriate footballers in Sweden
German expatriate sportspeople in Bulgaria
Expatriate footballers in Bulgaria